Het Notite Boeck der Christelyckes kercke op de Manner of Philips Burgh is a rare surviving record book of the Old Dutch Church of Sleepy Hollow in Sleepy Hollow, New York.

Abraham de Revier Sr. evidently kept a private memorandum book that is now lost to history, which was heavily drawn upon in 1715 by Dirck Storm to compose the church's history. The Old Dutch Church's book of records is one of the most important books in early American history—chronicling Dutch Colonial American village life in the English-occupied Province of New York.

The book is divided into five "books" or divisions:
First Division: Dirck Storm's Brief History of Tarrytown and Sleepy Hollow. 
Second Division: Members Registrar, 1697–1775
Third Division: List of Elders and Deacons, 1697–1776, 1790
Fourth Division: Baptisms, 1697–, 1791
Fifth Division: Marriages, 1697–1790

References

External links
First Record Book of the 'Old Dutch Church of Sleepy Hollow' Organized in 1697 and now The First Reformed Church of Tarrytown, N. Y.

New York (state) culture
History of the Thirteen Colonies
Books about New York City
1715 books